This is a list of museums in Papua New Guinea.

 Papua New Guinea National Museum and Art Gallery
 Madang Museum
 J. K. MacCarthy Museum

See also 

 List of museums

External links 
 Papua New Guinea - Libraries and museums

Museums
 
Papua New Guinea
Museums
Museums
Papua New Guinea
Museums